Jamaica participated in the 2010 Winter Olympics in Vancouver, British Columbia, Canada.

Ski Cross

Errol Kerr qualified in the new event of ski cross, becoming Jamaica's first ski team competitor. Kerr was born and raised in the United States to an American mother and Jamaican father. He was a dual citizen between Truckee, California and Westmoreland Parish in Jamaica. Kerr previously competed with the United States Ski Team, but desired to compete for his father's country. He was also the Jamaican flag bearer.

Non-qualified athletes
The two-man bobsleigh team of Hanukkah Wallace and Joel Alexander was on line to qualify as the first Jamaican two-man team but did not make the final qualification. The four-man team, though ranked within the top 50 internationally, also failed to qualify.

References 

2010 in Jamaican sport
Nations at the 2010 Winter Olympics
2010